Ethel Rojo  (née Ethel Inés Rojo Castro; December 23, 1937 in Santiago del Estero – June 24, 2012 in Buenos Aires) was an Argentine actress, vedette, dancer and theater director. She was the sister of Gogó Rojo.

Filmography 
 1955: Pobre pero honrado
 1956: El satélite chiflado
 1957: Amor se dice cantando
 1961: Tres de la Cruz Roja
 1962: Esa pícara pelirroja
 1964: Minnesota Clay
 1964: Stop at Tenerife
 1965: Fuerte perdido
 1974: Hay que romper la rutina
 1975: Maridos en vacaciones
 1976: La noche del hurto
 1977: La obertura
 1980: Sujeto volador no identificado
 1980: La noche viene movida
 1980: Frutilla
 1985: Mingo y Aníbal contra los fantasmas
 2008: Luisa

Television
She was the TV entertainer in Gánele al Dos (1988).

References

External links
 

1937 births
2012 deaths
Argentine stage actresses
Argentine vedettes
People from Santiago del Estero
Burials at La Chacarita Cemetery